The Hapuka River is a river of Westland District, New Zealand. It flows from near The Woolsack north-west to join the Okuru and Turnbull Rivers just before they enter the Tasman Sea. The river is slow-moving and drains swampy land. There are brown trout in the lagoon area.

See also
List of rivers of New Zealand

References

Land Information New Zealand - Search for Place Names

Westland District
Rivers of the West Coast, New Zealand
Rivers of New Zealand